Sault Ste. Marie, Ontario, Canada at the far eastern end of Lake Superior and the beginning of the St. Mary's River.

History
The Canadian government opened the airport in 1961 and operated it until 1998, when it handed control over to the newly formed Sault Ste. Marie Airport Development Corporation (SSMADC) under the terms of the National Airports Policy. Of the 23 Ontario regional, local, or small airports handed over under the policy, the Sault Ste. Marie airport is the only one not affiliated with a municipality, since the city of Sault Ste. Marie declined to assume control.

In 2002, the SSMADC opened Runway Park, an entertainment and recreation area, on unused airport property to help generate revenue to support the airport's operation.

Historical airline jet service
 Air Canada: Bombardier CRJ-100, Bombardier CRJ-200, DC-9-30, Airbus A319-100, Airbus A320-200, Airbus A321-211 (Sault Ste. Marie-Toronto in 1967 to 1989 using DC-9-30 but rest was charter)
 Canadian Airlines International: Boeing 737-200 (Sault Ste. Marie-Toronto in 1987 to 1989)
 Canadian Partner: ATR 42, EMB-120 Brasilia (Sault Ste. Marie-Toronto in 1989 to 1993)
 Canadian Regional Airlines: Dash 8-100, Dash 8-300, Fokker F28 (Sault Ste. Marie-Toronto in 1993 to 2000)
 Canjet: Boeing 737-800 (Seasonal in 2010's)
 Nordair: Boeing 737-200 (Sault Ste. Marie-Toronto in 1968 to 1987)
 NorOntair: Dash 6 Twin Otter, Dash 8-100 (Sault Ste. Marie-Sudbury, Sault Ste. Marie-Thunder Bay, Sault Ste. Marie-Elliot Lake, Sault Ste. Marie-Wawa in 1971-1996)
 WestJet: Boeing 737-200 (Sault Ste. Marie-Hamilton in 2001 to 2004)

Airlines and destinations

Passenger

Cargo

Operations
The Sault Ste. Marie airport has equipment to support instrument approaches for all-weather operation, and a Nav Canada control tower. Air Canada Express operates four daily roundtrip flights to Toronto Pearson International Airport using Dash 8-300. Porter Airlines operates two daily roundtrip flights to Toronto Billy Bishop Airport using Dash 8-400. Sunwing Airlines seasonal winter charters operate every thursday roundtrip flights to London International Airport to Juan Gualberto Gómez Airport (Varadero) using Boeing 737-800 aircraft. Its runways are designed to handle medium-sized transport jets such as the Airbus A320, Airbus A319 and Boeing 737; operations to Sault Ste. Marie consist of Dash 8 aircraft, and, seasonally, of Boeing 737 jets.

The airport is classified as an airport of entry by Nav Canada and is staffed by the Canada Border Services Agency (CBSA) on a call-out basis from the Sault Ste. Marie International Bridge. CBSA officers at this airport can handle aircraft with no more than 30 passengers.

A new record number of 216,172 passengers travelled through the airport in 2018.

General aviation operations
The airport hosts the flight-training campus for Sault College and the Sault Academy of Flight flying school, resulting in frequent training flights in the vicinity. The Sault Ste. Marie airport has frequent medevac, business aviation, and charter operations. It is a frequent stopping point for private pilots.

Ministry of Natural Resources Fire Management & Flight Training Centre
Sault Ste. Marie Airport is home to the Ministry of Natural Resources Fire Management Centre and Flight Training Centre. The 622-square-metre facility is the first of its kind in Ontario. It is equipped with one of the most advanced flight training devices available, which simulates the sights, sounds and motions of the Canadair CL-415 water bomber aircraft used to fight forest fires in Ontario.

Statistics

See also

 List of airports in the Sault Ste. Marie, Ontario area

References

External links

Sault College Aviation Technology
Soo Aviation
Runway Park

Transport in Sault Ste. Marie, Ontario
Certified airports in Algoma District